

List

References

P